Sophie Wilde (born 1997/1998) is an Australian actress. She is known for her roles in the Stan series Eden (2021), the BBC series You Don't Know Me (2021), and ITV period drama Tom Jones (2023). She was named a 2020 rising star by the Casting Guild of Australia (CGA).

Early life
Wilde was born to an Ivorian mother and an Australian father. She has a younger brother and grew up in Enmore, an Inner West suburb of Sydney.

When she was a child, Wilde's grandparents would take her to "theatre shows, the opera and random musicals". From the age of five, she took drama classes at the National Institute of Dramatic Art (NIDA) and the Australian Theatre for Young People (ATYP). She attended Newtown High School of the Performing Arts for secondary school and then returned to NIDA, graduating in 2019 with a Bachelor of Fine Arts in Acting.

Career
In 2021, Wilde made her television debut as Scout in the Stan drama series Eden. Wilde said that it was the "first audition where she had gut-certainty that it was the right role". Later that year, she starred as Kyra opposite Samuel Adewunmi in the BBC three-part series You Don't Know Me. To prepare for the role, Wilde practised her English accent by watching and listening to British actresses such as Michaela Coel. 

Wilde made her feature film debut in the horror film Talk to Me, which screened at the 2022 Adelaide Film Festival and the 2023 Sundance Film Festival. As of 2023, Wilde stars as Sophie Western in the ITV period drama Tom Jones alongside Solly McLeod and Hannah Waddingham, and has an upcoming role in the film The Portable Door starring Christoph Waltz.

In August 2022, Wilde was cast as the lead Mia Polanci in the Netflix series The Fuck It Bucket. She has an upcoming role in another Netflix series Boy Swallows Universe.

Filmography

Film

Television

Music videos
 "River of Neglect" (2019), Charbel

Stage

References

External links
 

Living people
21st-century Australian actresses
Actresses from Sydney
Australian people of Ivorian descent
People educated at Newtown High School of the Performing Arts
People from the Inner West (Sydney)